The individual events for badminton at the 2021 Southeast Asian Games will be held from 19 to 22 May 2022 at the Bac Giang Gymnasium, Bắc Giang, Vietnam. It will be contesting 5 events: the men's singles, women's singles, men's doubles, women's doubles and mixed doubles.

Men's singles

Seeds 

 Loh Kean Yew (silver medalist)
 Kunlavut Vitidsarn (gold medalist)
 Chico Aura Dwi Wardoyo (quarter-finals)
 Khosit Phetpradab (quarter-finals)

Draw

Women's singles

Seeds 

 Pornpawee Chochuwong (gold medalist)
 Yeo Jia Min (quarter-finals)

Draw

Men's doubles

Seeds 

 Pramudya Kusumawardana / Yeremia Rambitan (silver medalist)
 Leo Rolly Carnando / Daniel Marthin (gold medalist)
 Man Wei Chong / Tee Kai Wun (withdrew)
 Terry Hee / Loh Kean Hean (bronze medalist)

Draw

Women's doubles

Seeds 

 Jongkolphan Kititharakul / Rawinda Prajongjai (quarter-finals)
 Benyapa Aimsaard / Nuntakarn Aimsaard (silver medalist)

Draw

Mixed doubles

Seeds 

 Rinov Rivaldy / Pitha Haningtyas Mentari (bronze medalist)
 Hoo Pang Ron / Cheah Yee See (silver medalist)
 Adnan Maulana / Mychelle Crhystine Bandaso (bronze medalist)
 Chen Tang Jie / Peck Yen Wei (gold medalist)

Draw

See also
Men's team tournament
Women's team tournament

References

Individual event